is a Japanese essayist and translator.

Biography
She was born in Tokyo.

Bibliography 
オリエントの舌

References

External links 
Official Website: Author biography

See also
 Japanese literature
 List of Japanese authors

1939 births
Living people
Japanese writers